Samir Ramizi (born 24 July 1991) is a Serbian professional footballer who plays as a attacking midfielder for Swiss club FC Winterthur.

Club career

Neuchâtel Xamax
On 4 June 2016, Ramizi signed a two-year contract with Swiss Challenge League club Neuchâtel Xamax. On 23 July 2016, he made his debut in a 2–1 home win against former club Servette after coming on as a substitute at 71st minute in place of Gaëtan Karlen.

FC Winterthur
On 6 August 2020, Ramizi signed a two-year contract with Swiss Challenge League club FC Winterthur. On 12 September 2020, he made his debut in the 2020–21 Swiss Cup second round against Tuggen after being named in the starting line-up.

Personal life
Ramizi of Albanian descent.

Career statistics

References

External links

1991 births
Living people
People from Bujanovac
Serbian footballers
Albanians in Serbia
Serbian expatriate footballers
Serbian expatriate sportspeople in Kosovo
Serbian expatriate sportspeople in Switzerland
Association football midfielders
Football Superleague of Kosovo players
KF Drenica players
FC Drita players
Swiss Promotion League players
Étoile Carouge FC players
Swiss Challenge League players
FC Stade Nyonnais players
FC Wohlen players
FC Winterthur players
Swiss Super League players
Servette FC players
Neuchâtel Xamax FCS players